Robert Nevin may refer to:
Robert M. Nevin (1850–1912), American lawyer and politician
Robert Reasoner Nevin (1875–1952), United States federal judge
Bob Nevin (born 1938), American ice hockey player